This is a list of ISO 639-5 codes, including the code hierarchy as given in the ISO 639-5 registry. The code und (undetermined) from ISO 639-2 can be seen as top of the hierarchy (for example, und:aav, und:euq:eu). The hierarchy is not a complete genetic hierarchy; some of the collection codes are based on geography (like nai) or category (like crp) instead.

List

Notes
SIL International treats ISO 639-2 code him (Himachali languages / Western Pahari languages) as an ISO 639-5 code, although it does not appear in the official list of ISO 639-5 codes maintained by the Library of Congress (the registration authority for ISO 639-5).

See also
 Lists of ISO 639 codes

Sources

References

External links
 
 ISO 639-5 Registration Authority - Library of Congress

ISO 639